Robert C. "Bobby" Weed, Jr. (born April 13, 1955), president of Bobby Weed Golf Design, is a golf course designer and builder specializing in design, renovation and repurposing. A protégé of Pete Dye, he resides in Ponte Vedra Beach, Florida. Weed is a member of the American Society of Golf Course Architects (ASGCA), the Golf Course Superintendents Association of America (GCSAA) and the Florida Turfgrass Association.

Education and professional career
Weed attended Presbyterian College and Lake City Community College, in North Florida, in the Golf Course Operations and Landscape Technology program. He began his professional career with an extended apprenticeship with Pete Dye, launching a collaboration of over 35 years’ duration and a lifelong friendship. Hired in 1983 by the PGA Tour as a Certified Golf Course Superintendent at TPC @ Sawgrass, Weed progressed to the Tour’s in-house Chief Designer from 1987–96, where he was responsible for the design of many of today’s best-known TPC venues, which continue as host sites for prominent Tour events. From 1985-95, Weed held certification through the GCSAA as a Certified Golf Course Superintendent.

In 1994, Weed formed Bobby Weed Golf Design, which has amassed a list of new and renovated courses that are ranked consistently at the top of their respective categories, including The Olde Farm Club, Spanish Oaks Golf Club, The Golf Course at Glen Mills, Medalist Golf Club and Timuquana Country Club.

Weed also is co-founder and a board member of HEAL! (Healing Every Autistic Life). The HEAL Foundation is a local non-profit organization, based in Ponte Vedra Beach, Florida, serving individuals and families living with autism spectrum disorders. Weed has a nonverbal autistic daughter who has experienced much growth and success with the support of HEAL.

Selected course portfolio for Bobby Weed Golf Design 
Weed started his own company in 1994—Bobby Weed Golf Design—and has designed or redesigned an impressive list of highly regarded courses. A partial list of his work follows:

Original 
 Grove XXIII - Hobe Sound, Florida
 Spanish Oaks Golf Club – Bee Cave, Texas
 Olde Farm Golf Club – Orchard Course – Bristol, Virginia
 StoneRidge Golf Club – Stillwater, Minnesota
 The Golf Course at Glen Mills – Glen Mills, Pennsylvania

*Weed/Dye original designs 
 Country Club of Landfall – Pete Dye Course – Wilmington, North Carolina
 Amelia Island Plantation’s Ocean Links – Fernandina Beach, Florida

Tournament 
 Slammer & Squire Golf Course – World Golf Village – St. Augustine, Florida
 TPC Las Vegas – Las Vegas, Nevada
 TPC Summerlin – Las Vegas, Nevada
 TPC Tampa Bay – Lutz, Florida
 TPC River Highlands – Cromwell, Connecticut
 Mito Kourakuen Country Club – Mito, Japan
 Dye’s Valley Course at TPC Sawgrass – Ponte Vedra Beach, Florida

Renovation 
 Culver Academies Golf Course – Culver, Indiana
 Grandfather Golf and Country Club – Linville, North Carolina
 Medalist Golf Club – Hobe Sound, Florida
 New Orleans Country Club – New Orleans, Louisiana
 Palatka Golf Club – Palatka, Florida
 Palma Ceia Golf and Country Club – Tampa, Florida
 Timuquana Country Club – Jacksonville, Florida
 White Manor Country Club – Malvern, Pennsylvania
 Ocean Course at Ponte Vedra Inn and Club – Ponte Vedra Beach, Florida

*Dye/Weed renovation 
 Long Cove Club – Hilton Head Island, South Carolina

Selected honors and awards 
 David Hueber Golf Community Sustainability Award at Clemson University was presented to Bobby Weed in 2012.
 The South Carolina General Assembly issued a resolution on April 23, 2003, recognizing Bobby Weed, a South Carolina native, for being named the 2003 South Carolina Golf Association Golfweek honoree in recognition of his long and distinguished career in golf course design.
 Golfdom Magazine selected Bobby Weed as one of its People of the Year for 2000.
 Golf Inc. Renovation of the Year 2012 – Palma Ceia Golf and Country Club
 Golf Inc. Renovation of the Year 2010 – Linville Ridge Golf Club

References

External links
Bobby Weed Golf Design
American Society of Golf Course Architects profile
TPC profile
Healing Every Autistic Life website

Golf course architects
American landscape architects
People from Columbia, South Carolina
1955 births
Living people
People from Irmo, South Carolina